Bezanjerd-e Eslami (also Romanized as Bezanjerd-e Eslāmī; also known as Bejangerd and Pezhangerd) is a village in Bakharz Rural District, in the Central District of Bakharz County, Razavi Khorasan Province, Iran. At the 2006 census, its population was 260, in 60 families.

See also 

 List of cities, towns and villages in Razavi Khorasan Province

References 

Populated places in Bakharz County